The Battle of Handan began in 259 BC and concluded in 257 BC, during which the garrison of Handan, the capital city of Zhao, joined by the allied force of Wei and Chu, defeated the invading army of Qin. It was one of the most remarkable failures of the Qin army after the Reform of Shang Yang.

Background
Just months prior to the siege, Zhao suffered a major loss in Battle of Changping, during which more than 400,000 soldiers were killed by the Qin army led by Bai Qi. When the state of Zhao was still in pain, Qin launched another attack to the Shangdang region of Zhao. Qin quickly captured Pilao and Taiyuan which caused panics in Zhao and Han states. To stop Qin's invasion, Han and Zhao ceded several towns to Qin. Fan Ju, the chancellor of Qin, persuaded the King Zhaoxiang of Qin to take those towns and stop the military campaign, while the general Bai Qi wanted to keep on invading those two states aiming to wipe them out completely. The king accepted Fan Ju's strategy and stopped the campaign, which caused some conflict between Fan Ju and Bai Qi.

When King Xiaocheng of Zhao planned to cede six towns according to the treaty, some governors stopped him. A governor called Yu Qing told the king that ceding towns to Qin would only made Qin a bigger threat. He suggested that instead of ceding six towns to Qin, Zhao should cede six towns to Qi in order to gain the support from the powerful state in the east. Meanwhile, Zhao should form an allied force with Han, Wei, Yan and Chu to stop the eastward expansion of Qin together. The king took the suggestion of Yu Qing and began to prepare a potential total conflict against Qin.

Qin was annoyed by Zhao after Zhao refused to cede six towns as promised. The king of Qin decided to launch another war. He wanted to make Bai Qi the general, but Bai Qi refused to do so because he knew that this was not a good chance to defeat Zhao since Zhao was well prepared and was allied with other states.

The war

Siege of Handan
In July of 259 BC, Qin started the war against Zhao. Wang Ling was appointed as the leading general of Qin forces. Wang led Qin troops to Handan and besieged the city. Soldiers of Zhao fought very hard because they knew that if they lost, the state of Zhao would no longer exist. Wang Ling was trapped under the wall of Handan for almost two years, and five of his vice generals were killed in the battle. The king of Qin asked Bai Qi to replace Wang Ling but Bai Qi refused once more. Then, the king sent Wang He to the frontline to reinforce Wang Ling.

Call for help from Chu and Wei 

In 258 BC, when the defense of Handan was hard, Zhao decided to call for help from Chu and Wei. The king of Zhao sent Lord Pingyuan to Chu to ask for the reinforcement. Lord Pingyuan planned to select 20 assistants from his entourages but only 19 spots were filled. An entourage named Mao Sui recommended himself to be the 20th assistant. Lord Pingyuan said, "Talent is to a person what a pin is to a bag. The pin would break the bag no matter what, so people would see it. Talent could not be hidden. You have been here for three years but you have done nothing amazing. If you were talented, I should have noticed it." Mao Sui said, "You never saw the pin of my talent because you have never put it into a bag." Lord Pingyuan thought it was a good reply, so he let Mao Sui to go with him.

Lord Pingyuan and his 20 assistants arrived in the capital city of Chu. Lord Pingyuan met the King Kaolie of Chu and asked for the reinforcement but the king was hesitating. Mao Sui drew his sword out and approached the king of Chu, yelling at the king, "Why are you hesitating?" The king of Chu asked, "Who is this man?" Lord Pingyuan answered, "He is one of my assistants." The king said, "How come a low-ranked assistant could yell at me?" Mao Sui said to the king, "You are respected by others because you are the king of Chu, a state with great military strength. However, at the present, I am only five steps away from you, so your soldiers could not save you if I am going to kill you. Now you should listen to me. " Then he listed importance and benefits of rescuing Zhao. The king of Chu was impressed, so he agreed to send a troop of 100,000 soldiers, led by Lord Chunshen, to Handan to fight along with Zhao.

At the same time, the wife of Lord Pingyuan wrote to the king of Wei to ask for help. Her younger brother was Lord Xinling of state Wei. Wei agreed to send 80,000 men to Handan to rescue Zhao. This troop was led by general Jin Bi. Knowing Wei was attempting to join the force with Zhao, Qin sent a word to the king of Wei to threat him. The envoy of Qin told the king of Wei that if Wei gave Zhao any reinforcement, Qin would attack Wei after wiping out Zhao. The king of Wei was scared, so he asked Jin Bi to stop moving forward. Jin Bi and the troop set a base at the city of Ye and stopped from marching towards Handan. Lord Xinling tried to persuade the king of Wei to continue supporting Zhao, but the king refused due to the fear. Therefore, Lord Xinling decide to lead his own army (about 100 chariots) to Handan in order to save his sister, even though he knew that this would be more like a suicide attack.

A hermit changed Lord Xinling's mind. He gave Lord Xinling some advise. Following the hermit's words, Lord Xinling asked a concubine of the Wei king to steal the Tiger Seal (虎符, a seal for the highest-ranked military commander with which one can give orders to the entire army in the region) from the king's bedroom. Then, Lord Xinling asked a warrior to take the Tiger Seal to see Jin Bi and order him to continue moving forward. Jin Bi checked the Tiger Seal and confirmed it was real, but he still refused to move forward because he somehow knew the Tiger Seal was not given by the king but stolen from the bedroom. Then, the warrior killed Jin Bi and gave the order to the army. The army of Wei then continued marching towards Handan under the lead of Lord Xinling.。

The defeat of Qin
In December of 257 BC, armies of both Wei and Chu arrived at Handan. They launched an attack from the backside of Qin army. Meanwhile, Lord Pingyuan led 3,000 soldiers to attack Qin's army from the side of Handan. The army of Qin was defeated by the allied forces of Zhao, Wei and Chu. Wang He and the remnant of Qin army retreated to Fencheng; the vice general of Qin, Zheng Anping, surrendered to Zhao.

Influences 
King Zhaoxiang of Qin was enraged by the result of the war. He decided that Bai Qi was the one to blame since he refused to be the commander. Later, he forced Bai Qi to commit suicide. Fan Ju was also blamed by the king and lost the position of chancellor. 

The state of Zhao survived the total attack. It would last for about 30 years before being eventually conquered by Qin in 222 BC (Handan was captured in 228 BC).

References

Sima Qian, Shi Ji

Handan
Handan
3rd century BC in China
Qin (state)
Zhao (state)
Wei (state)
Chu (state)